Dennis James Baker (born 29 December 1947) was an Australian cricketer who played for Western Australia and Tasmania. His career was from 1972 until 1982.

On 28 July 2000, Baker was awarded the Australian Sports Medal with the citation reading "Dual Sheffield Shield representative for WA/Tas/career of more than 25 years".

References

External links

1947 births
Living people
Australian cricketers
Tasmania cricketers
Western Australia cricketers
People from Norseman, Western Australia
Recipients of the Australian Sports Medal
Cricketers from Western Australia